Śliwniki  is a village in the administrative district of Gmina Parzęczew, within Zgierz County, Łódź Voivodeship, in central Poland.

The village has a population of 125.

References

Villages in Zgierz County